Boleszkowice refers to the following places in Poland:

 Boleszkowice, Myślibórz County
 Boleszkowice, Szczecinek County
 Gmina Boleszkowice, gmina (administrative district) in Myślibórz County